Robinvale Airport  is an airport located  south of Robinvale, Victoria, Australia.

Airlines and destinations
Currently, no scheduled passenger services operate at the airport.

See also
 List of airports in Victoria

References

Airports in Victoria (Australia)